S̀ (minuscule: s̀) is a letter of the Latin alphabet, formed from S with the addition of a grave accent. It is used in Ugaritic transliteration and the SICC orthography for the Dakota language.

Encodings

The HTML codes are:
&#58032; for S̀ (upper case)

See also
 Grave accent
 Z̀
 ś

References 

Latin letters with diacritics
Phonetic transcription symbols